Major-General Sir George Bourchier KCB (23 August 1821 – 15 March 1898) was a British officer who served in the Bengal Army, one of three armies that made up the British Indian Army.

Biography
Bourchier was the son of the Rev. Edward Bourchier and Harriet Jenner. He was educated at the Addiscombe Military Seminary.

He entered the Bengal Artillery in 1838 and took part in the Gwalior campaign 1843–1844. He was stationed at Punniar.

During the Indian Mutiny he commanded a battery at Thimbu Ghat and was present at the siege and capture of Delhi. He was at Bulandshahr, Alighar, and Agra with Sir Colin Campbell for the relief of Lucknow and at Cawnpur.

He was commissioned a Brevet Colonel and C.B. From 1864 to 1866. he commanded the Royal Artillery in Bhutan. In 1871, he commanded the East Frontier District, and in 1871 to 1872 he commanded the Cachar column in the Lushai Expedition. He was award the K.C.B. in 1852 and promoted to Major-General. He died on 15 March 1898.

Notes

References

1821 births
1898 deaths
British Indian Army generals
Knights Commander of the Order of the Bath
British East India Company Army officers
British military personnel of the Lushai Expedition
British military personnel of the Indian Rebellion of 1857
British military personnel of the Bhutan War
British military personnel of the Gwalior Campaign
Military personnel from Hertfordshire